Sir Henry Gough (3 January 1649 – 24 January 1724) of Perry Hall, then in Staffordshire, was an English politician who sat in the House of Commons between 1685 and 1705.
 
Gough was the eldest son of John Gough (died 1665) of Old Fallings and his second wife, Bridget, the daughter of Sir John Astley of Woodeaton, Oxfordshire. He was the elder brother of Sir Richard Gough. He matriculated at Christ Church, Oxford, in 1666 and entered Middle Temple in 1667. He lived at Perry Hall in Staffordshire. He married Mary Littleton, the daughter of Sir Edward Littleton, 2nd Bt., of Pillaton Hall, Staffordshire in 1668.

Gough was High Sheriff of Staffordshire for the year  1671 to 1672. In 1678, he was knighted  for services his grandfather rendered to Charles I in 1642. He was elected as a Tory Member of Parliament for Tamworth in 1685, 1689 and 1699. In 1705, he was elected MP for Lichfield.

Gough died on 24 January 1724 and was buried at Bushbury. Only three of his eleven sons survived including  Harry Gough (1681–1751).

References 

1649 births
1724 deaths
Alumni of Christ Church, Oxford
Politicians from Staffordshire
Gough-Calthorpe family
High Sheriffs of Staffordshire
English MPs 1685–1687
English MPs 1689–1690
English MPs 1705–1707